Elias Yanes Álvarez (16 February 1928 – 9 March 2018) was a Spanish Roman Catholic bishop.

Yanes Álvarez was ordained to the priesthood in 1952. He served as titular bishop of Mulli and auxiliary bishop of the Roman Catholic Diocese of Oviedo, Spain from 1970 to 1977. Yanes Álvarez then served as Archbishop of the Roman Catholic Archdiocese of Zaragoza from 1977 until 2005.

Publications 
 Yo no creo en los curas (1964) 
 El discernimiento pastoral (1975)  
 Enseñanza religiosa y libertad de enseñanza en el marco de la actual democracia española (1983)  
 La educación cristiana, don de Dios a su Iglesia (1987)  
 Opciones fundamentales del movimiento rural cristiano (1991)  
 La Acción Católica, un don del espíritu (2000)  
 En el espíritu y la verdad, espiritualidad trinitaria (2000)  
 Hombres y mujeres de oración (2007)

Notes

1928 births
2018 deaths
Archbishops of Zaragoza